Bloomfield Academy may refer to:
Bloomfield Academy (Skowhegan, Maine), listed on the NRHP in Maine
Bloomfield Academy (Oklahoma), former Chickasaw nation girls' school, site of which is listed on the NRHP in Oklahoma
Bloomfield Academy (Las Pinas, Philippines), A school for Grade school and High School